Vasek Pospisil and Bobby Reynolds were the defending champions but decided not to participate together.
Reynolds played alongside Carsten Ball, while Pospisil played with Pierre-Ludovic Duclos.
Martin Emmrich and Andreas Siljeström won the title, defeating Artem Sitak and Blake Strode 6–2, 7–6(7–4) in the final.

Seeds

Draw

Draw

References
 Main Draw

Tallahassee Tennis Challenger - Doubles
2012 Doubles